The Trade Union Federation for Professionals (VCP) is a national trade union centre bringing together unions representing managers and professionals in the Netherlands.

The federation was established in 1974, as the Federation of Middle and Higher Personnel.  By 1998, it had only four affiliates, of which, the Dutch Central Organisation of Middle and Higher Personnel, and the Central Union of Middle and Higher Civil Servants and Staff were federations of smaller unions.  It became the VHP in 2014, and it is affiliated to the European Trade Union Confederation.  Its current affiliates include:

 Police Union ACP
 ANBO
 CMHF
 De Unie
 The Black Corps (HZC)
 Synergo-vhp
 UOV
 VKP
 VHP2
 VHP Tata Steel
 VNV

External links

References

Trade unions established in 1974
National trade union centers of the Netherlands